is a Japanese footballer currently playing as a midfielder for Nara United.

Career statistics

Club

Notes

References

1985 births
Living people
Japanese footballers
Japanese expatriate footballers
Association football midfielders
Albirex Niigata Singapore FC players
Ryohei Maeda
Ryohei Maeda
Ryohei Maeda
Singapore Premier League players
Japanese expatriate sportspeople in Singapore
Expatriate footballers in Singapore
Japanese expatriate sportspeople in Thailand
Expatriate footballers in Thailand